The Duchess of Kent's Annuity Act 1838 (1 & 2 Vict. c. 8) was an Act of Parliament in the United Kingdom, signed into law on 26 January 1838. It empowered Queen Victoria to grant an annuity of £30,000 to her mother, the Duchess of Kent, on the condition that all previously existing annuities to the duchess were to cease.

References
The British almanac of the Society for the Diffusion of Useful Knowledge, for the year 1839. The Society for the Diffusion of Useful Knowledge, London, 1839.

1838 in British law
United Kingdom Acts of Parliament 1838
Annuities